Holcomb is an unincorporated community in Nicholas County, West Virginia, United States.

Holcomb was named in honor of John Holcomb, a local merchant.

References

Unincorporated communities in Nicholas County, West Virginia
Unincorporated communities in West Virginia